Orion Charter Township is a charter township of Oakland County, Michigan, United States. The population was 39,816 as on July 1, 2019.

The official motto of the township and village is "Where living is a vacation".   "Lake Orion" is often used to describe both the village and the township. The township hosts General Motors' Orion Assembly plant which produces small cars.

Communities
 Lake Orion is an incorporated village located within Orion Township.
The Township has three unincorporated communities:
 Eames began as a station on the railroad in 1874.  It was given a post office in 1883.
 Lake Orion Heights is located between Lake Orion, Square Lake and Elkhorn Lake(  Elevation: 1007 ft./307 m.).
 Gingellville, also Gingleville, is located at Baldwin and Gregory Roads (  Elevation: 1017 ft./310 m.).
Former places include:
 Rudds Mill (also known as Rudds Station) is located at Kern and Clarkston Roads (  Elevation: 945 ft./288 m.).
 Cole was a station on the Pontiac, Oxford and Northern Railroad.  It had a post office from 1884 until 1907.

Geography

Orion Township Is bordered to the east by Oakland Township, to the west by Independence Township, to the south by Auburn Hills and to the north by Oxford Township.

Demographics
As of the census of 2000, there were 33,463 people, 12,246 households, and 8,976 families residing in the township. The racial makeup of the township was 95.42% White, 1.26% African American, 0.27% Native American, 1.18% Asian, 0.02% Pacific Islander, 0.61% from other races, and 1.23% from two or more races. Hispanic or Latino of any race were 2.56% of the population.

There were 12,246 households, out of which 39.7% had children under the age of 18 living with them, 63.0% were married couples living together, 6.9% had a female householder with no husband present, and 26.7% were non-families. 20.8% of all households were made up of individuals, and 4.0% had someone living alone who was 65 years of age or older.  The average household size was 2.71 and the average family size was 3.19.

In the township the population was spread out, with 28.5% under the age of 18, 7.3% from 18 to 24, 36.4% from 25 to 44, 21.7% from 45 to 64, and 6.2% who were 65 years of age or older.  The median age was 34 years. For every 100 females, there were 102.8 males.  For every 100 females age 18 and over, there were 100.5 males.

The median income for a household in the township was $71,844, and the median income for a family was $83,514. Males had a median income of $61,562 versus $36,481 for females. The per capita income for the township was $30,299.  About 2.0% of families and 3.2% of the population were below the poverty line, including 3.5% of those under age 18 and 4.1% of those age 65 and over.

Education
The majority of students attend Lake Orion Community Schools. A  small portion is in the Pontiac School District. Another portion of students also attend Clarkston, Rochester and Oxford Community School Districts.

St. Joseph Catholic School is located in the township.

Notable people
This list includes people from Orion Township and the Village of Lake Orion
 Scott Amedure, The Jenny Jones Show murder victim
 Matthew Blackmer, American pair skater
 Christopher Bowman, U.S. Winter Olympian, National Champion, World Medalist champion figure skater {Sparks, Encyclopædia Britannica. March, 2008}
 William Broomfield, former congressman
 Pat Caputo, sportswriter for The Oakland Press, radio personality at WXYT-FM
 Rolla C. Carpenter, engineer, academic, writer
 Dave Collins, former professional baseball player, former coach at Lake Orion High School
 Barbara Ann Crancer, associate circuit court judge, daughter of Jimmy Hoffa
 Matthew Dear, musician
 Andrew J. Feustel, NASA astronaut
 Frontier Ruckus, art-folk band
 Tom Gillis, professional golfer
 Jeff Heath, professional football player
 Frederick Henderson, former CEO of General Motors
 James P. Hoffa, current International Brotherhood of Teamsters President, son of Jimmy Hoffa
 Jimmy Hoffa (family summer home), former International Brotherhood of Teamsters President
 Zak Keasey, former professional football player
 Mickey Lolich, former professional baseball player and donut shop owner
 James Marcinkowski, politician, attorney, former CIA case officer
 Chris "Hot Wings" Michels, syndicated radio show host
 Jamie Milam, professional hockey player
 Troy Milam, professional hockey player
 Frank Novak, former NFL coach
 Raymond Plouhar, staff sergeant, USMC
 William Edmund Scripps, newspaper magnate
 Rich Strenger, lawyer, former professional football player
 Rod Taylor, former professional hockey player
 Ron Tripp, World Sambo and Judo champion; President of USA Judo
 Cynthia Watros, actress
 Mike Weger, business owner, former professional football player
 Louis George Carpenter, College Professor, Dean of Engineering & Physics at Colorado State University

See also

 List of cities, villages, and townships in Michigan

References

External links

 
 Orion Township Public Library
 Lake Orion Community Information Network

Townships in Oakland County, Michigan
Charter townships in Michigan
Metro Detroit
1835 establishments in Michigan Territory
Populated places established in 1835